McNair is a census-designated place located in the Oak Hill section of Fairfax County, Virginia, United States. It is directly to the east of Washington Dulles International Airport. The population as of the 2010 census was 17,513. Much of the population resides in the McNair Farms planned community. The community has a school called McNair Elementary.

McNair is also home to the Dulles Corner Business Park, home to the headquarters of Airbus Group, Inc. and Northrop Grumman Technical Services.

Geography

The CDP is in northwestern Fairfax County, bordered to the northeast by the town of Herndon, to the east by Reston, to the south by Floris, and to the northwest by Loudoun County. The Dulles Toll Road (Virginia State Route 267) forms the northern edge of the CDP, and Virginia State Route 28 (Sully Road) forms part of the western border.

References

Census-designated places in Fairfax County, Virginia
Washington metropolitan area
Census-designated places in Virginia